Willard is an unincorporated community located in the town of Hendren, Clark County, Wisconsin, United States. Willard has a post office with ZIP code 54493.

Name
The post office at Willard, and in turn the settlement itself, was named after Willard Foster (1876–1945), the youngest son of Nathaniel Caldwell Foster (1834–1923). Foster established the Foster Lumber Company in Fairchild, Wisconsin, and the company founded Willard in 1911.

Images

References

Unincorporated communities in Clark County, Wisconsin
Unincorporated communities in Wisconsin